Benthic landers are observational platforms that sit on the seabed or benthic zone to record physical, chemical or biological activity. The landers are autonomous and have deployment durations from a few days (for biological studies) to several years (for physical oceanography studies).

Benthic landers come in a variety of shapes and sizes depending upon the instrumentation they carry, and are typically capable of working at any ocean depth.

See also

 Marine snow
 Mooring (oceanography)
Bottom crawler

References

Oceanographic instrumentation